System R may refer to:
IBM System R
Relevance logic

See also
 R Systems International